Kari Aartoma (born 1958) is a Finnish poet, writer, translator and columnist. He lives in Turku, Finland. His first work,  (Clouds Do Not Stick To Anything), was published in 1999 by Nihil Interit.

He is a member of the poetry group Hellät elätit.

His 2019 novel,  (A City of Two Rivers), deals with alcoholism. Aartoma, a self-described alcoholic, spent eight years writing the novel.

Works
Clouds Do Not Stick To Anything (Pilvet eivät pidä mistään kiinni), Nihil Interit 1998
Concrete Schubert (Betonischubert), Sammakko 2001
Hetero, Sammakko 2005
The City of Two Rivers (Kahden Joen Kaupunki)

References

Finnish male poets
1958 births
Living people